The Abernethy Round Tower is a stone-built Irish-style round tower which stands in School Wynd, at the edge of the village cemetery, in Abernethy, Perth and Kinross, Scotland.

Dating from the 11th century, the tower is one of only two such towers surviving in Scotland—the other is at Brechin—and is protected as a scheduled monument.

The twelve lower layers are of a different coloured stone to the rest of the building, leading to speculation that the base was built earlier than the rest. There are indications that the tower originally had six wooden floors, probably connected by ladders. Fixed to the outside base of the tower is a Pictish stone; the tower also has an iron joug or pillory attached.

Various changes have been made to the tower over the years, including the installation of an iron spiral staircase when it became a lookout tower, windows and an outside clock. The current clock dates from 1868.

Here Malcolm III of Scotland paid homage to William the Conqueror some six years after the Battle of Hastings.

References

Round towers
Scheduled Ancient Monuments in Perth and Kinross